{{DISPLAYTITLE:C18H15N}}
The molecular formula C18H15 (molar mass: 245.32 g/mol, exact mass: 245.1204 u) may refer to:

 Diphenyl-2-pyridylmethane
 Triphenylamine

Molecular formulas